Henry Fredberg is a retired Swedish footballer. Fredberg was part of the Djurgården Swedish champions' team of 1917.

Honours

Club 
 Djurgårdens IF 
 Svenska Mästerskapet: 1917

References

Swedish footballers
Djurgårdens IF Fotboll players
Association footballers not categorized by position
Year of birth missing